This is a list of episodes from the fourth season of Happy Days.

Cast

Main
 Ron Howard as Richie Cunningham
 Henry Winkler as Arthur "Fonzie" Fonzarelli
 Marion Ross as Marion Cunningham
 Anson Williams as Warren "Potsie" Weber
 Don Most as Ralph Malph
 Erin Moran as Joanie Cunningham
 Tom Bosley as Howard Cunningham

Guests
 Al Molinaro as Alfred "Al" Delvecchio 
 Jack Dodson and Alan Oppenheimer as Dr. Mickey Malph 
 Ed Peck as Officer Kirk, 
 Roz Kelly as Pinky Tuscadero
 Conrad Janis as Mr. Kendall
 Charlene Tilton as Jill
 Lynda Goodfriend as Kim
 Nancy Walker as Nancy Blansky
Danny Butch as Spike
 Pat Morita as Arnold
 Eddie Mekka as Carmine Ragusa

Broadcast history
The season originally aired Tuesdays at 8:00-8:30 pm (EST).

Episodes

Consisted of 25 episodes airing on ABC.
Recurring Character Debuts: Al Delveccio (Al Molinaro).

References

Happy Days 04
1976 American television seasons
1977 American television seasons